Scott Pilgrim vs. the World is a 2010 film, co-written and directed by Edgar Wright. It has received many awards and nominations. It also made the final shortlist of seven films for nomination in the Best Visual Effects category at the 83rd Academy Awards, but did not receive a nomination.

Best-of lists

 No. 1 –  Ain't It Cool News (Harry Knowles)
 No. 3 – HitFix
No. 3 – The Film Stage
 No. 6 – Collider
 No. 6 (on Top Twenty Films of 2010) – Empire Online

 In the top 10 – Austin Film Critics Association
 No. 10  – Las Vegas Film Critic Society
 No. 13 (on Top Fifteen Films of 2010) – The A.V. Club
 One of the Best Popcorn Movies of 2010 – Seattle Times

It was also listed on Empire's Best Movie Scenes of 2010 list, and ranked number 47 on Empire's Top 100 Films of the 21st century in 2020.

2010

2011

2012

Notes

References

External links
 

Lists of accolades by film
Scott Pilgrim